Lindenwood may refer to a place in the United States:

Lindenwood, Illinois
Lindenwood, Queens, New York
Lindenwood Cemetery, Fort Wayne, Indiana

In education:
 Lindenwood University in St. Charles, Missouri
 Lindenwood University – Belleville (2009–2020) in Belleville, Illinois. Now a satellite campus of Lindenwood University.

In other:
"Lindenwood" or "linden wood", wood of the linden tree (genus Tilia)